Young Romance is a 1915 American silent romance film directed and produced by George Melford. The film is based on the play of the same name by William C. deMille who also wrote the screenplay. Edith Taliaferro, who made only three films in her career, stars in this film which is the only one of her films that still exists.

Cast

 Edith Taliaferro as Nellie Nolan
 Tom Forman as Tom Clancy
 Al Garcia as Count Spagnoli
 Raymond Hatton as Jack
 Florence Dagmar as Lou
 Charles Wells as Motor boatman/chauffeur
 Mrs. Lewis McCord as Landlady
 Marshall Mackaye as Bell Boy
 Harry De Vere as Sila Jenkins
 J. Parks Jones as Young Jenkins
 Violet Drew as Telegraph operator
 Gertrude Kellar as Mrs. Jenkins

DVD release
Young Romance was released on DVD by Image Entertainment along with Raoul Walsh's Regeneration.

References

External links

Lobby poster

1910s romance films
American romance films
American silent feature films
American black-and-white films
Famous Players-Lasky films
American films based on plays
Films directed by George Melford
Films shot in New York City
Paramount Pictures films
1910s American films
1910s English-language films
English-language romance films